The All Nepal Federation of Trade Unions (ANTUF) is a national trade union center representing workers in Nepal. The Federation had its origins in the Nepalese Civil War and was created by activists from the Communist Party of Nepal (Maoist).  Following the peace accords in 2006, the ANTUF was founded in 2007.  The ANTUF is made up of 35 affiliated organisations. In January 2019, following the creation of the Nepal Communist Party, talks commenced for a merger between the ANTUF and the General Federation of Nepalese Trade Unions (GEFONT).

Affiliates
The ANTUF has 30 affiliated unions:
 All Nepal Industrial Workers’ Union
 All Nepal Transport Workers’ Union
 All Nepal Hotel, Casino and Restaurant Workers’ Union
 All Nepal Construction Workers’ Union
 All Nepal Health Workers’ Union
 All Nepal Communication, Press and Publication Workers’ Union
 All Nepal Garment and Textile Workers’ Union
 All Nepal Security Workers’ Union
 All Nepal Carpet Workers’ Union
 All Nepal Agriculture Workers’ Union
 All Nepal Painter Workers’ Union
 All Nepal Shop and Sales Workers’ Union
 All Nepal Tea Workers’ Union
 All Nepal Road Workers’ Union
 All Nepal Artist Workers’ Union
 All Nepal Institution, Bank and Finance Workers’ Union
 All Nepal Metal Workers’ Union
 All Nepal Petroleum Workers’ Union
 All Nepal Rickshaw Workers’ Union
 All Nepal Self-Employed Workers’ Union
 All Nepal Tourism Workers’ Union
 All Nepal Domestic Workers’ Union
 All Nepal Steel Workers’ Union
 All Nepal Auto-Mechanic Workers’ Union
 All Nepal Beautician Workers’ Union
 All Nepal Cleaning Workers’ Union
 All Nepal Brick Factory Workers’ Union
 All Nepal Government, Temporary, Daily Wage, Contract Workers’ Union
 All Nepal Social Institution National Workers’ Forum
 All Nepal Progressive Migrant Workers Forum

References

National trade union centers of Nepal
2007 establishments in Nepal